The U.S. state of Colorado first required its residents to register their motor vehicles and display license plates in 1913. , plates are issued by the Colorado Department of Revenue through its Division of Motor Vehicles. Front and rear plates are required for most classes of vehicles, while only rear plates are required for motorcycles and trailers.

The basic design of Colorado's license plate, a range of mountains against a white or green background, has been in use since 1960 (except for 1973 and 1975–76). In 2000, a screened, more detailed version of the mountain range replaced the previous dark green version.

Passenger baseplates

1913 to 1974
The 1955 (dated 1956) issue was the first Colorado license plate that fully complied with these standards: the 1954 (dated 1955) issue was 6 inches in height by 12 inches in width, but had non-standard mounting holes.

1975 to present

County coding

Colorado introduced numeric county codes on its passenger and motorcycle license plates in 1932, with the order of the codes based on the populations of each of the state's 63 counties at the time. These codes were used through 1958 (except in Denver, which last used code 1 in 1955).

Two-letter codes replaced the numeric codes in 1959, with blocks assigned to each county in the same order. For each code, serials ran to 9999 on passenger plates, and to 999 on motorcycle plates. The move to multi-year plates in the mid-1970s resulted in several counties exhausting their blocks and being assigned new ones.

In 1982, three-letter codes were introduced on passenger plates. AAA through DZZ were assigned to Denver, and GAA through TZZ to the next five most populous counties (Jefferson, El Paso, Boulder, Arapahoe and Adams); blocks of codes in the 'E', 'F', 'U', 'V' and 'W' series were then assigned to the remaining counties in roughly alphabetical order. For each code, serials ran from 001 to 999. Again, several counties exhausted their blocks and were assigned new ones, with Douglas and Elbert borrowing blocks of 'D' series codes from Denver's assignment. From July 1992, serials for each code ran from 1000 to 9999, and the previously unused letters I and O were added. Motorcycle plates continued to use two-letter codes (some of which were reassigned to other counties), with revised formats featuring three and later four digits between the letters (e.g. A123A and A1234A in Denver).

The table below reflects the two- and three-letter codes that were actually issued on passenger plates, rather than what was assigned.

Non-passenger plates
When the current passenger baseplate was introduced in 2000, the state also simplified its non-passenger and specialty plates, issuing them in the same serial format (originally 123-ABC) and with similar graphic elements.

2000 to present
The serials on non-passenger types are embossed unless noted.

Prior to 2000

Specialty plates

2000 to present
Specialty types have surface-printed serials. Some types are available in personalized format, in which case the type logo, which normally appears at the center of the plate between the numbers and the letters of the serial, is absent.

Prior to 2000

Renewal date tags
Colorado implemented a monthly staggered registration system in 1978, with separate stickers for the month and year of the expiration date (placed at the bottom left and bottom right of the plate respectively). , month stickers are blue on white, while year stickers rotate through a four-color system introduced in 2002, as follows:

  02 
  06 
  10 
  14 
  18 
  22 

  03 
  07 
  11 
  15 
  19 
  23 

  04 
  08 
  12 
  16 
  20 
  24 

  05 
  09 
  13 
  17 
  21

References

External links
Colorado's License Plates
Colorado license plates, 1969–present
Colorado license plates

Colorado
Symbols of Colorado
Transportation in Colorado
1913 introductions
1913 in transport
Colorado transportation-related lists